Lincoln Theatre is a multi-purpose theatre in Mount Vernon, Washington, United States.  The theatre is located at 712 South First St. It was originally constructed in 1926 as a vaudeville and silent movie house, and currently shows movies several days a week, as well as hosting concerts and other activities.  The theatre also contains one of only 98 Wurlitzer theatre organs still located in their original installation.

Volunteer work
Because of the nature of the Lincoln Theatre, nearly every person who helps with running the theatre does so through volunteering, to keep the maintenance costs as low as possible.  Some of the volunteering positions include ticket sales, poster distribution, cleaning, and concessions. Volunteers are often reimbursed for their time in the form of free entry into ticketed events held at the Lincoln.

Theatre organ

The organ at the Lincoln Theatre is a two-manual, seven-rank style D Special.  The addition of "Special" to the style is from the addition of a full piano (with pedal piano extension) to the right of the console, a marimba to the left, and a kinura rank located in the pipe chamber.  The cost of purchasing and installing the organ at the time was $22,500.

Because of the niche area of theatre organ culture, only a few volunteers are in charge of caring for and playing the organ.  Some concerts have been held exclusively for the organ; however, it is mostly played for 30 minutes before a movie showing by one of the volunteers.  On nights which feature an organist, one of the lobby volunteers places a notice informing guests of who is playing that night.

References

External links
 Lincoln Theatre
 YouTube playlist featuring videos from the Lincoln Theatre

Mount Vernon, Washington
Buildings and structures in Skagit County, Washington